Tirugu Leni Manishi is a 1981 Indian Telugu-language action film, produced by K. Devi Vara Prasad under the Devi Film Productions banner and directed by K. Raghavendra Rao. It stars N. T. Rama Rao, Chiranjeevi and Rati Agnihotri, with music composed by K. V. Mahadevan. The film was the biggest flop delivered by NTR-K. Raghavendra Rao duo.

Plot
Raja, a young lawyer, starts his practice and wins his first case. He is the son of big-shot Sasibhushan Rao and the brother of Padma. Padma falls in love with Kishore, who is a singer playing guitar at local clubs. Sasibhushan Rao does not accept their love and insults Kishore for his poverty. Padma attempts suicide by consuming sleeping pills, but her brother Raja saves her on time and performs her marriage with Kishore during the absence of their father. Their father gets angry at them, but excuses his daughter and gets close to them when she gives birth to a child. Raja, on the other hand, keeps meeting a girl, Seeta, and her uncle Donga Ramudu, who cheats people for money. He tries to reform them and employs them in his own office. In an unexpected incident, Raja realizes that his father was related to a smuggling gang that deals with gold and diamonds. His father is killed but does not reveal anything about the gang. Raja meets Nangulu, who was once helped by his father, and tries to take his advice in busting the gang. In his attempts, he is shocked to know that Kishore is involved with the gang. He warns Kishore to quit this and helps him to trace their boss. Kishore doesn't listen to him, but when his boss kidnaps his child and asks him to kill Raja, Kishore understands where he is standing and decides to turn in favor of his brother-in-law. Both heroes cheat the gang and enter their den to realize that their boss is none other than Nangulu, who was acting all the way by being on Rajasekhar's side. The movie ends with the heroes fighting the gang out and saving Kishore's child.

Cast

Soundtrack

Music composed by K. V. Mahadevan. Lyrics were written by Acharya Aatreya.

External links 

1980s Telugu-language films
1981 films
Films scored by K. Chakravarthy
Films directed by K. Raghavendra Rao